Gloeocorticium is a genus of fungi in the Cyphellaceae family. The genus is monotypic, containing the single species Gloeocorticium cinerascens, found in Argentina.

References

External links
 

Cyphellaceae
Taxa described in 1986
Fungi of South America
Monotypic Agaricales genera